Batrachedra eurema is a species of moth of the family Batrachedridae. It is found on Lord Howe Island between Australia and New Zealand and Guadalcanal north east of Australia.

References

External links
Description

Batrachedridae
Moths of Australia
Moths described in 1956